Mufti, based in Mumbai, India, is men clothing fashion brand, founded by Kamal Khushlani in 1998. The company was started with a ₹10,000 loan from Khushlani's maternal aunt. It manufactures shirts, jeans, t-shirts, sweatshirts, sweaters, Joggers, Blazers and jackets. It is 

owned and managed by Credo Brands Marketing Private Limited. It owns 1,400 multi brand outlets and 120 large format stores. In July 2018, Mufti signed Kartik Aaryan as a brand ambassador.

In 2014, Bennett, Coleman & Co. Ltd. and some of Khushlani's friends owned a 35 per cent stake and Khushlani holds a 65 per cent stake in the company. Mufti expanded into the footwear in December 2018. In February 2019, Mufti was recognized as a "Retailer of the Year" award at Global Awards for Retail Excellence organised by ET Now and Asia Retail Congress and won CMAI's Brand of the Year Award in 2015.

In 2018, the brand announced it will be expanding its product portfolio by focusing on athleisure clothing and accessories.

Awards

References

External links 
  
 Outdoor Apparel & Adventure Gear
 Retail is in an era of digital boom: Kamal Khushlani, Mufti
 Mufti: Successfully balancing the demand-supply paradigm of the dynamic menswear market

Clothing retailers of India
Clothing brands of India
Clothing manufacturers
Clothing brands
1998 establishments in Maharashtra
Organisations based in Mumbai
Indian companies established in 1998
Clothing companies established in 1998
Retail companies established in 1998